The 2005–06 George Mason Patriots men's basketball team represented George Mason University in the 2005–2006 NCAA Basketball season. The team achieved several milestones, including a team-record 23 regular season wins, and earned an at-large bid to that year's NCAA tournament.

In the NCAA Tournament, the Patriots reached the Final Four, becoming the first team from the Colonial Athletic Association to accomplish that feat. The number 11 seed in the East region, they advanced to the Final Four by knocking off UConn, the tournament's No. 1 overall seed, 86–84 in overtime in the Elite Eight. George Mason, which had never won an NCAA tournament game up until this tournament, thus tied the 1986 LSU Tigers as the lowest seed to ever reach the Final Four. The Patriots then lost to eventual national champions, Florida.

Season notes

 On April 26, 2006, it was announced head coach Jim Larranaga received a contract extension to keep him with the team through the 2011–2012 season.
 On March 30, 2006, head coach Jim Larranaga received the Clair Bee Coach of the Year Award.
 For the first time in school history, the men's basketball team was ranked on the ESPN/USA Today Coaches' Poll coming in at #25 for the week of February 20, 2006.
 On December 27, 2005, senior guard Lamar Butler set a George Mason men's basketball record for most career 3-point field goals.
 The 2005–06 George Mason Patriots were predicted to finish 3rd in the Colonial Athletic Association.
 On September 15, 2005, it was announced that sophomore guard John Vaughan would miss the entire season due to a torn ACL.

Awards

First Team All-CAA
 Jai Lewis

Second Team All-CAA
 Tony Skinn

CAA All-Defensive Team
 Will Thomas

CAA Player of the Week
 Jai Lewis – Jan. 30
 Tony Skinn – Feb. 20

Recap
The Patriots enjoyed their best season in 2005–2006 when they won a school-record 23 games in the regular season, and for one week were even ranked in the USA Today/ESPN Top 25 for the first time in school history. Head coach Jim Larranaga, who began his stint at George Mason in 1997, also became the CAA's all-time leader in coaching victories and was named the winner of the 2006 Clair Bee Coach of the Year Award on March 31, 2006, and the Virginia Coach of the Year on June 26, 2006, the same day he was nominated for an ESPY award. Although the team lost to Hofstra during the CAA tournament, George Mason were still able to grab an at-large bid in the NCAA tournament. This marks the first time in which the Patriots earned an at-large bid and the first time in 20 years in which the CAA sent two teams to the tournament (the other being conference tournament winner UNC Wilmington).

The Patriots entered the tournament as an 11th seed and defeated the 6th seeded Michigan State Spartans, who had played in the previous year's Final Four.

In their second round matchup against the defending champion North Carolina Tar Heels, the Patriots were once again underdogs. After falling in a 16–2 hole early in the game, the team was able to bounce back and win the game, 65–60. Their next game was against another mid-major, the Wichita State Shockers. George Mason jumped out to a big early lead, and the Shockers were not able to overcome. The Patriots won, 63–55.

Their Elite Eight matchup found themselves facing the Connecticut Huskies, a team that was tabbed as the favorite to win the national championship the entire season. The Patriots were able to defeat the top-seeded Huskies, 86–84 in overtime, in what is recognized as one of the most memorable games in tournament history. Their tournament run would end in Indianapolis, in a Final Four matchup with the Florida Gators, the eventual national champion in both 2006 and 2007 (with the same starting lineup both years).

The Patriots were the first team out of the CAA to reach the Final Four and also became the second team to reach it as a double-digit (11th) seed (the other being the LSU Tigers in 1986, also an 11th seed).

George Mason's Cinderella story ended in Indianapolis, when the eventual National Champion Florida Gators defeated them 73–58 on April 1, 2006. Despite their loss, many sports analysts considered their performance in the 2006 tourney to be the best run by a mid-major in tournament history. In the final rankings of 2005–2006 season, the USA Today/ESPN poll ranked the Patriots eighth in the nation—their highest rank to date.

Mason was atypical of recent Final Four teams not only in being a true mid-major, but also in their unusual scoring balance. The Patriots had five players average in double figures, making them one of only six Final Four teams in the 10 seasons from 1998 to 1999 through 2007–08 with that distinction. (Two of the other five teams in this club are Florida's back-to-back national champions in 2006 and 2007.)

Roster

Stats

Schedule

|-
!colspan=9| 2006 NCAA Division I men's basketball tournament

Recruits

The following is a list of commitments George Mason received for the 2006–07 season:

 Louis Birdsong
 Darryl Monroe 
 Dre Smith

References

George Mason
George Mason Patriots men's basketball seasons
NCAA Division I men's basketball tournament Final Four seasons
George Mason
George Mason Patriots men's basketball team
George Mason Patriots men's basketball team